Meshack Maphangule (born 9 August 1991) is a South African footballer.

In 2022, he spent time without a club before rejoining Chippa United.

References

1991 births
Living people
South African soccer players
Association football forwards
Dynamos F.C. (South Africa) players
Black Leopards F.C. players
Orlando Pirates F.C. players
Chippa United F.C. players
Marumo Gallants F.C. players
Pretoria Callies F.C. players
South African Premier Division players
National First Division players